Karoline Lund (born 31 May 1999) is a Norwegian female handballer who plays for Paris 92.

She also represented Norway in the 2017 Women's Junior European Handball Championship, placing 7th, and in the 2016 Women's Youth World Handball Championship, placing 4th.

In February 2021, Lund signed a 3-year contract with København Håndbold.

Achievements
Junior World Championship: 
Silver Medalist: 2018

References
 

1999 births
Living people
Handball players from Oslo
Norwegian female handball players
Expatriate handball players
Norwegian expatriate sportspeople in Denmark
Norwegian expatriate sportspeople in France
21st-century Norwegian women